Barry O'Connell (Paddington, Sydney), is an Australian rugby league footballer who played in the 1950s 1960s. He played in the New South Wales Rugby League (NSWRL) - Australia's major competition in that sport.

Biography 

Barry was one of three O'Connell brothers to play for the Eastern Suburbs club in the New South Wales Rugby League (NSWRL), older brother Wally captained Australia in that sport.

O'Connell attended Waverley primary and Paddington technical college.

O'Connell, who played in the halves, was an Easts junior who debuted with the club in the 1956 at the age of 19. In the years 1956–59, he scored 177 points from 11 tries and 72 field goal, he made around 60 appearances for the Eastern Suburbs club, many as captain.

In 1960, Barry joined the Manly Warrigah club, playing 85 matches, many of those also as captain. He played for Manly in the years 1960–64. After leaving Manly he took up a role as a  captain-coach in the rural NSW town of Mudgee. His final year of rugby league, 1967, was spent captaining the Dunedoo club, who played in the Group 14 competition, to their first premiership, and was named as that competition's leading player.

References
 

Australian rugby league coaches
Australian rugby league players
Sydney Roosters players
Manly Warringah Sea Eagles players
Manly Warringah Sea Eagles captains
Living people
Year of birth missing (living people)
Rugby league players from Sydney